Snap parliamentary elections were held in Algeria on 12 June 2021 to elect all 407 members of the People's National Assembly. Initially expected for 2022, the elections were held early in the context of a constitutional amendment propagated by a referendum in November 2020.

Background

2017 legislative election
The legislative election of May 2017 was characterized by a low turnout of 35%, even worse than the 43% of the legislative election of 2012. Polls showed a renewal of the ruling coalition, a alliance between the National Liberation Front (FLN) and the National Rally for Democracy (RND), which retains the absolute majority of seats in the National People's Assembly, despite a sharp decline in the FLN.

Society in Algeria has been tense for several years due to the fall in the price of a barrel of oil with the government never having succeeded in ending the country's dependence on hydrocarbons, which represent 60% of the state budget. A large part of the population is encountering economic difficulties due to the impact of this fall in the national budget on the prices of basic necessities which are heavily subsidized by the state.

2019–20 Algerian protests

President Abdelmadjid Tebboune, controversially elected in December 2019 following the massive protests known as "Hirak", initiated a constitutional reform at the start of his term which led to the holding of a referendum on November 1, 2020. President Tebboune declared that an early dissolution of the two chambers of parliament would take place in late 2020 if the new constitution is approved by the population. While the referendum was approved, the call for new election was delayed by the transfer of Tebboune to Germany for over two months to get treatment for COVID-19.

Electoral system
Algeria has a bicameral parliament of which the People's National Assembly is the lower house. This is made up of 407 seats filled by proportional representation in 59 constituencies corresponding to the 58 Provinces (prefectures) of the country plus one constituency representing the diaspora. Each constituency is allocated a number of seats according to its population: one seat per segment of 120,000 inhabitants, plus one seat for any remaining segment of 60,000 inhabitants, with a minimum of three seats per constituency. The lists are open, with preferential voting, without mixing, and an electoral threshold of 5% of the votes cast, after counting of the votes, the distribution of seats is done according to the method known as "the strongest remainder".

These are the first elections since the modification of the electoral law a few months earlier, which introduced open lists and the electoral threshold. Exceptionally for this ballot, the new law lifts the conditions restricting the participation of parties to only those having obtained at least 4% of the votes cast in the previous elections, or gathered the sponsorship signatures of 250 citizens in each of the constituencies. in which one of their candidates presents himself. The total number of seats is also reduced for this election, dropping from 462 to 407 seats following a presidential decree modifying the distribution key according to the population. The previous elections were in fact organized with one seat per 80,000 inhabitants, plus one seat for any remaining 40,000 inhabitants, for a minimum of four seats per constituency.

A total of 24,490,180 voters are registered to vote, including 23,587,815 in Algeria and 902,365 abroad. The total amount was later reduced to 24,453,992 voters after appeals to the Constitutional Court.

Results
The election saw the lowest turnout of those held for the legislature in Algerian history (only the 2020 Algerian constitutional referendum saw a lower turnout overall), with under 23% of the eligible population participating. The governing National Liberation Front won a plurality of seats, although both it and coalition partner Democratic National Rally saw heavy losses. The nationalist Future Front, the Islamist Movement of Society for Peace and new National Construction Movement, and independents all saw large gains at their expense, while other entities saw minor changes. A total of 136 seats were won by candidates under the age of 40, 35 were won by women, and 274 were won by those with a tertiary education.

Following the elections, a coalition was formed by the National Liberation Front, Democratic National Rally, Future Front, and National Construction Movement, as well as several members from independent lists.

References

Algeria
Legislative election
Elections in Algeria
Algeria
Election and referendum articles with incomplete results